Belkovo is a rural locality (a settlement) in Gorkinskoye Rural Settlement, Kirzhachsky District, Vladimir Oblast, Russia. The population was 61 as of 2010.

Geography 
The village is located 3 km north from Gorka, 14 km north from Kirzhach.

References 

Rural localities in Kirzhachsky District